The Order of Military Medical Merit (02M3) is a private organization that was founded by the Commanding General of the U.S. Army Health Services Command in 1982 with the goal of recognizing excellence and promoting fellowship and esprit de corps among Army Medical Department (AMEDD) personnel. Medical personnel from all branches of the United States military are eligible for the award. Membership in the Order denotes distinguished service which is recognized by the senior leadership of the AMEDD, and is signified with the presentation of a white brass or sterling silver medallion on a maroon ribbon.

Notable recipients

Patricia Horoho
Geoffrey Ling
William C. Patrick III
Eric Schoomaker
Vic Snyder
Loree K. Sutton
James A. Zimble

References

External links
 AMEDD Center of History & Heritage Website

Awards and decorations of the United States Army